Sherve Peak is a peak rising to 2200 m in the west part of Guardrail Ridge in Kyle Hills, Ross Island. It was named by Advisory Committee on Antarctic Names (US-ACAN) (2000) after John Sherve, facilities maintenance supervisor/construction coordinator at McMurdo Station, 1988–94; ASA resident manager at McMurdo Station, winter 1994; National Science Foundation (NSF) McMurdo Station manager, December 1997-Nov. 1998.

Mountains of Ross Island